Birgitta Margaretha Ulfsson (1 July 1928 – 8 October 2017) was a Finnish actress and theater director. She was a versatile actor and a recognized pioneer of avant-garde theater in Finland.

She started her career at Svenska Teatern, a theater in Helsinki for Swedish-language theater productions. She created roles both in Finnish and in Swedish language, and from the early 1980s, she worked regularly also in Sweden.

In Sweden, she was best known as "Muminmamma" in the TV series about Mumintrollet and for her role in Rederiet.

Personal life
From 1952 to 1984, she was married to actor Lasse Pöysti. From 2007 until her death in 2017, she was married to Iwar Wiklander. The couple resided in Gothenburg, Sweden. Her son Erik Pöysti and granddaughter Alma Pöysti are both actors in Helsinki.

Selected filmography
1983 – A Hill on the Dark Side of the Moon
1986 – The Serpent's Way 
1992 – Sunday's Children

References

1928 births
2017 deaths
Finnish film actresses
Actresses from Helsinki
Finnish stage actresses
20th-century Finnish actresses
Finnish theatre directors
Women theatre directors
Finnish expatriates in Sweden
Swedish-speaking Finns